Mikaela Tommy (born May 10, 1995) is a Canadian alpine ski racer.

She competed at the 2015 World Championships in Beaver Creek, USA, in the giant slalom.

References

1995 births
Canadian female alpine skiers
Living people
Skiers from Ottawa
Alpine skiers at the 2012 Winter Youth Olympics